The 30th Artistic Gymnastics World Championships were held at Sun Dome Fukui in Sabae, Japan in 1995.

Results

Medal table

Overall

Men

Women

Participants

Men

Women

Men's results

Team final
NB: Team rosters are incomplete.

All-around

Floor exercise

Pommel horse

Still rings

Vault

Parallel bars

Horizontal bar

Women's results

Team final

All-around

Vault

Uneven bars

Balance beam

Floor exercise

NB: At this competition, tiebreakers were not used. When two gymnasts received the same score in event finals, they both received a medal.

World Artistic Gymnastics Championships
G
W
International gymnastics competitions hosted by Japan
Sport in Fukui Prefecture
Sabae, Fukui